The Cypriot Cup for lower divisions is a domestic cup for the teams who participate in the Cypriot Third Division and in the STOK Elite Division (ex Fourth Division).

Format
It was created in the 2008–09 season by Cyprus Football Association. Participation in this cup is not compulsory, so the number of the clubs that participate is different each year. The competition is a knockout tournament. The matches in the first two rounds are single-legged and the matches in quarterfinals and semifinals are two-legged. The final is a single match played in neutral ground. The winner and the finalist of the cup are receiving a respectful amount of money by CFA as a bonus prize. The sponsor of the competition is Coca-Cola.

Finals
The list of finals:

Performance by club

Participations and performance per club
The following table shows the participations per club in the cup since its foundation up to the 2017-18 season, and the statistics of each team regarding the wins, the times were finalists, their presence in the semifinals and the quarterfinals, and the number of qualifications and eliminations of each team achieved or suffered.

The teams are classified based on the number of entries in the competition. So far, a total of 62 teams participated in the Cypriot Cup for lower divisions. No team has participated in all the cup editions (10 in total, including the 2017-18 season).

Legend:

References

Football cup competitions in Cyprus
Cup
Cup
Cypriot Cup for lower divisions seasons